Krrish 3 is a 2013 Indian Hindi-language superhero film written, produced and directed by Rakesh Roshan, who wrote the screenplay with Honey Irani and Robin Bhatt. It is the third film in the Krrish series, following Koi... Mil Gaya (2003) and Krrish (2006). The film stars Hrithik Roshan, Vivek Oberoi, Priyanka Chopra and Kangana Ranaut. The story follows Krishna Mehra, alias Krrish, and his scientist father, Rohit Mehra, who face an elaborate conspiracy orchestrated by the evil genetist Kaal and his gang of mutants, led by the ruthless Kaya.

Krrish 3 was initially scheduled to release as a 3D film. However, due to lack of release time to convert the film to 3D, director Rakesh Roshan mentioned that the film will be released only in the 2D format. Krrish 3 released worldwide on 1 November 2013. It has received generally positive reviews from critics.

Plot
Rohit Mehra lives with his son Krishna in Mumbai. Krishna is married to Priya, a journalist for Aaj Tak and Rohit works in a research institute. Krishna, while moonlighting as superhero Krrish, is regularly fired from various day jobs due to lack of attendance. Rohit is researching a device that will bring life to dead tissues by the use of solar energy. 

A deadly virus is spreading in Namibia whose antidote has not yet been discovered. Rohit's friend Dr. Varun Shetty, and Dr. Alok Sen, a scientist who wants to meet him to reveal information about the virus, are murdered by Kaya, a shapeshifting female mutant. She is the secretary of Kaal, a handicapped evil genetist with telekinetic powers. Kaal creates a team of human-animal hybrids called Maanvars with distinct physical powers to cure himself but to no avail.  

The virus was spread by Kaal himself to incur huge profits by selling its antidote. Rohit discovers that the virus, now spreading through Mumbai, has no effect on Krishna, Priya (pregnant with Krishna's child) or himself. He makes an antidote with Krishna's blood, which he spreads with explosions. Kaal sends his mutants to attack Rohit. Krrish saves Rohit but Priya is injured. Carrying out Kaal's instructions, Kaya shapeshifts into Priya while Priya is kidnapped by Kaal. 

Posing as Priya, Kaya leads Krishna to believe that Priya has lost her child, and lives with the Mehras. While discovering the truth behind the antidote, she develops feelings for Krishna. Rohit travels to Singapore to seek answers from Dr. Siddhant Arya's partner, where he is kidnapped by Kaal's men. Krishna discovers Priya's kidnapping, reveals himself as Krrish, and asks Kaya to take him to Kaal's laboratory. Kaya decides to help rescue Priya. It is revealed that Kaal is Rohit's son, created by an experiment conducted by Dr. Arya while Rohit was held hostage by him years earlier. He was born handicapped and adopted by a wealthy man. 

Kaal uses Rohit's bone marrow to cure his disability. Kaya saves Priya but is murdered by Kaal for her disloyalty. Kaal also murders Krrish. Rohit re-uses his failed dead tissues experiment to save Krishna. He transfers his powers to Krishna, killing himself. Krrish manages to kill Kaal using Rohit's solar experiment. Six months later, Priya names their newborn son, Rohit Mehra. The baby also seems to exhibit superpowers.

Cast
 Hrithik Roshan in a dual role as  
Krishna Mehra / Krrish: Krishna Mehra is Rohit's son who moonlights as Krrish, a superhero.
Rohit Mehra: Rohit is a professional scientist working in a Government organization.
 Vivek Oberoi as Kaal, a handicapped evil genetist who exhibits telekinetic powers. He is the founder of Kaal Laboratory and the creator of Maanvars, a team of mutants made by fusing the serum of humans and animals. He is the main antagonist of this film.
 Priyanka Chopra as Priya Mehra, Krishna's wife and a journalist for Aaj Tak.
 Kangana Ranaut as Kaya, Kaal's secretary and girlfriend who is created by fusing the serum of a woman and a chameleon. She is instrumental in Kaal's scheme because of her ability to shapeshift into anybody whenever she wishes. She later falls in love with Krishna after shapeshifting into Priya.
 Arif Zakaria as Dr. Varun Shetty, Rohit's scientist friend.
 Asif Basra as Dr. Alok Sen, a scientist working at Kaal Pharmaceuticals.
 Rajpal Yadav as Kripal Sharma, Krishna's friend and co-worker.
 Rakhee Vijan as Sharma's wife
 Gowhar Khan as Striker
 Nazia Shaikh as Cheetah Woman
Sameer Ali Khan as Ant Man
 Shaurya Chauhan as Scorpion Woman
 Danniel Kaleb as Rhino Man
 Vineet Sharma as Pilot of Air India aircraft
 Sachin Khedekar as Chief minister of Maharashtra (Special appearance)
 Naseeruddin Shah as Dr. Siddhant Arya (Special appearance)
 Mohnish Behl as Kaal's adoptive father (Special appearance)
 Raju Kher as a scientist in Kaal's lab
 Rekha and Preity Zinta appear as Sonia Mehra and Nisha, respectively, in flashback scenes from Koi...Mil Gaya and Krrish

Production
The film was referred to as both Krrish 2 and Krrish 3 in media reports. Hrithik Roshan confirmed in an interview to Rediff.com that on similar lines as with the Rambo franchise (where the first film was named First Blood, then came Rambo and then Rambo 3), the film will be called Krrish 3. Rakesh Roshan also clarified the title to Bollywood Hungama. In an interview director Rakesh Roshan said "I can't reveal the budget of the movie, but it has been a very costly film". Red Chillies VFX, a subdivision of Shah Rukh Khan's motion picture production banner Red Chillies Entertainment, worked on the special effects worth  for Krrish 3. The filming process was completed in June 2012, and then the VFX team started their work.

Filming

Principal photography began on 1 December 2011 with Vivek Oberoi, Kangana Ranaut and Priyanka Chopra. However, Hrithik Roshan did not participate in the first schedule due to a back injury. The primary location of filming was Filmistan Studios at Mumbai. Actress Shaurya Chauhan had an accident while shooting for the film in Hyderabad, due to which the film had to face some delays. On 29 August 2012, it was reported that, the makers had decided the superhero to indulge in the action sequences in snowy terrains. So, some part of the film was shot in Alps, Switzerland. Filming also took place in Jordan where a song featuring Roshan and Ranaut was shot. Rakesh Roshan stated in an interview that the shooting of Krrish 3 was completed by June 2013 with the VFX took one and half years to complete with the last of them coming on 22 October 2013, just 10 days before the release of the film with each and every VFX action sequence undergoing a revision of 40 to 50 times before inclusion.

Casting
Following the success of the previous instalments, director Rakesh Roshan planned to develop a second sequel to the franchise, with Hrithik Roshan playing the protagonist again. He had penned the script, but had to re-work it as the storyline was too similar to the Hollywood blockbuster Spider-Man 3. Priyanka Chopra was later confirmed to reprise the role of Priya. In this film, she will be seen married to Krishna Mehra.

Next, Chitrangada Singh announced her inclusion in the project as a mutant but left the film due to unspecified reasons. Later on, Jacqueline Fernandez was signed but she, later on, backed out of the film due to a lack of dates. It was reported that actresses Nargis Fakhri, Esha Gupta and Bipasha Basu were to replace Fernandez. Finally, Kangana Ranaut was confirmed to play the role, who coincidentally was originally offered the role. Rakesh Roshan had earlier revealed to the media that the main antagonist of the film would be as powerful as the hero. After talks with Ajay Devgn and Shah Rukh Khan fell through, Vivek Oberoi was eventually cast for the role. In an interview with Bollywood News Service, Oberoi said, "Kaal is contrary to my nature. I am very friendly and Kaal isn't," and added, "He has anger and vengeance burning within him; he hates humanity. To express these emotions through my eyes was difficult."

In January 2011, Lakshmi Manchu claimed to have been offered a role in the film as the antagonist's girlfriend. Its overseas distribution rights were sold to Eros International while Rakesh Roshan retained rights in Mumbai. There was also initial speculation that Rekha would play a major role in the film, which was later denied as a rumour.

Design and costumes
For the cast's costumes, Rakesh Roshan involved with designer Gavin Miguel. Roshan wanted a light and flexible costume to allow Kangana Ranaut to do her stunts without any restrictions where he stated  "She has a lot of toughness in her personality. So instead of looking at feminine superheroes for reference, I looked at Batman". It took three and half hours to apply Ranaut's makeup every day. Oberoi is dressed in a metal suit weighing around 28 kilograms, which required about 2–3 hours and 7-8 workers to fix on the body.

Soundtrack

The songs of the film are being composed by the legend Rajesh Roshan at Krishna Audio; whilst the background score is being composed by Salim–Sulaiman. The full soundtrack album was released on 18 September 2013 with music composed by Rakesh Roshan. The song Dil Tu Hi Baata is the 2nd hit song of multi-talented singer Zubeen Garg in this Bollywood industry.
Hindi

Tamil

Marketing
Promotions for the movie started post-July 2013 and the first look of Krrish 3 was unveiled online. Response for the poster was quite enthusiastic from the audience. The first trailer video was published by filmmakers on their official YouTube channel on 5 August 2013. It received more than 2.3 million views at YouTube within its first day of release and thereby surpassing the record held by Jab Tak Hai Jaan of 1 million views in one day. Krrish 3 trailer became the most watched Bollywood trailer on YouTube with 12 million views within two weeks, even eclipsing the trailers for such Hollywood superhero blockbusters as Thor (2011) and The Avengers (2012). Press reaction has been positive to the teaser trailer with many stating it echoes the look of recent superhero movies from Hollywood such as Iron Man 3, the Amazing Spider-Man and Man of Steel. Author of Bollywood: An Insider's Guide, Fuad Omar wrote on his blog that such comparisons were unfair given they were based on comic books and intellectual properties that had been developed over decades. He commented that Krrish was very much an original character created by Rakesh Roshan and developed by Filmkraft and so the film and character deserved credit for setting a new standard for an original superhero which has not been seen elsewhere in the world. He also stated that no other filmmaker in India or elsewhere has managed to achieve what Rakesh Roshan and Hrithik Roshan have in completely creating a new character and comes out with a hugely successful franchise that is original and has fueled a fanfare similar to those of comic book heroes yet with Krrish's story still being written with each film. Krrish 3 was the first Indian film to launch its own official Facebook Emoticons as part of promotion. An official Krrish 3 game was launched for Windows smartphones, tablets and PCs. The game was developed by Hungama Digital Media Entertainment and Gameshastra.

Release
The film was previously expected to release on 4 November 2013 but was brought forward to a 1 November, Diwali release. Krrish 3 released in over 4000 screens worldwide (3500 screens in India) and nearly 600 screens in key circuits overseas. The film saw its release in around 750 screens in the South India. Particularly in Andhra Pradesh, Krrish 3 was shown in over 425 screens with the highest being in Nizam, where released in more than 175 screens. The film was dubbed in Telugu and Tamil for release in South Indian states. The distributors of the film released the film in 150-200 screens in the TN and Kerala circuits.

Copyright litigation 
Uday Singh Rajput, a writer from Sagar district in Madhya Pradesh moved the Bombay High Court alleging copyright violation of the script of Krrish 3 and seeking a stay on the all India release of the film and claiming  20 million compensation. But, the High Court refused to grant relief to the writer.

Critical reception
Krrish 3 has received generally positive reviews, with an average 69% Rotten Tomatoes score based on the 13 reviews. Critics directed praise towards cast performances (particularly Hrithik Roshan, Kangana Ranaut and Vivek Oberoi), VFX, cinematography, background score, direction and entertainment value, but criticism has been directed towards the film's lack of originality, soundtrack and writing.

India
Taran Adarsh of Bollywood Hungama gave the film 4.5 out of 5 stars and stated that "the film has all the ingredients that make a splendid superhero film, besides being Rakesh Roshan's most accomplished work so far." Madhureeta Mukherjee of The Times of India gave it 4.5 stars while commenting "For sheer vision, bravado and superlative execution, this one soars to new orbits. Latch on to this cape for an exhilarating ride." Raedita Tandan of Filmfare awarded it 4 out of 5 stars, remarking "Hats off to Rakesh Roshan for dreaming big and actually pulling off this risky proposition. It's not perfect. But it has all the elements a good, entertaining film must have. All you Marvel superheroes, better watch out. Krrish is here to stay." Anupama Chopra of the Hindustan Times gave it 3.5 stars and said, "Filmmaker Rakesh Roshan deserves a round of applause for giving us a homegrown superhero. Krrish 3 is ambitious and exciting." Sarita Tanwar of DNA gave it 3.5 stars and wrote, "Krrish 3 is fast-paced and the VFX effects are smashing." Rohit Khilnani of India Today gave it 3.5 stars noting, "The only part where the movie dips are during the songs. The music sounds too dated for this action-packed film."

The professional review by the critic board of Box Office India magazine found Krrish 3 an industry-defining event movie, stating: "Krrish 3 is not only a BIG film but transcends expectations. The film makes you proud of how far we, as a film industry, have come. It also makes a bold statement that our industry is at par with Hollywood when it comes to special effects. Rakesh Roshan has incorporated everything a Hindi cine-goers could hope for in this production. It is commercial cinema at its best, with exquisite flavours of action, drama, emotion and thrills. And stitching it all together is content that provides a wide enough canvas that has something for everyone in every age group."

Rajeev Masand of CNN-IBN gave it 3 out of 5 and stated "I'm going with two-and-a-half stars for the film, and an additional half star just for Hrithik Roshan, which makes it three out of five for Krrish 3. The film is ambitious but flawed. It is, however, consistently watchable for its terrific lead star who you can't take your eyes off, even for a moment". Sukanya Verma of Rediff.com gave it 3 out of 5 stars, while adding, "Krrish 3 is an outrageous mishmash of Bollywood sentimentality meets E.T. meets Superman meets X-Men with set pieces, sound design and screenplay structure liberally borrowed from Hollywood's imagination." Aparna Mudi of Zee News rated the film 3 stars saying, "'Krrish 3' has all the elements of an entertainer and a lot of potential to have given some serious competition to Hollywood flicks."

Saibal Chatterjee of NDTV gave the film 2.5 stars stating, "Krrish 3 is, for the most part, impressively ambitious and dazzlingly competent, if not always riveting." Karan Anshuman of Mumbai Mirror gave it 2.5 stars and stated that Krrish 3 is a film for kids. Mohar Basu of Koimoi gave it 2 stars only and stated that Krrish 3 has absolutely no screenplay with poor acting and over the top dialogue. Shubhra Gupta of The Indian Express gave it 2 stars out of 5. Mihir Phadnavis of Firstpost stated that "Krrish 3 is the most superficial components of X-Men, Batman, Superman, Spiderman and even Shaktimaan stuffed together." Paloma Sharma of Rediff.com panned the film, and gave it "no stars" saying, "Krrish 3 is astonishingly eager to entertain with its stock of doodads that should amuse if not endear".

Overseas
Mohammad Kamran Jawaid of the Dawn gave Krrish 3 a rating of 3/5 stars stating that "so most of it is tiringly clichéd, ripped off from Marvel and DC comics (Krrish's Superman worship is rather blatant) and stick-glued together, it is startling when director Rakesh Roshan's underlying Bollywood-emotionalism compensates the flimsiness of the awkward superhero element from his last film". He closes by saying that the film "is family-friendly stereotypical entertainment".

David Chute for the Variety, applauded Krrish 3 as "a charming Bollywood superhero movie" from a different perspective and applauded the heart and upbeat spirit of the movie for "not being an audience-pummeling industrial product like most of Hollywood's superhero films."  He loved the way Krrish 3 "has the off-hand, anything-is-possible spirit of a children's book or fairy tale."

Lisa Tsering writing for The Hollywood Reporter gave the film a negative review saying that "the musical superhero extravaganza is too scary for young viewers and too long-winded for everybody else". She continues that the "effort is admirable and the effects are certainly adequate, but can't compensate for uninteresting, drawn-out action scenes; childish logic and uneven acting, especially by Hrithik Roshan, who as Rohit mouth-breathes and toddles around with his head cocked to one side. Worst of all, the movie is devoid of that one secret ingredient that makes audiences love superhero films: It just isn't cool."

Box office

India
Krrish 3 opened across the country in multiplexes to more than 80 percent occupancy as well as around 90-100 percent attendees at single screens. Krrish 3 (Hindi) grossed  nett on its second day. The film also recorded the sixth highest opening weekend worldwide as it collected  gross. Krrish 3 (Hindi) collected around  nett on Tuesday to take five-day total past  to  nett.

The film nett. grossed  on the second Friday. The second week thus collected  for the Hindi version of Krrish 3.

Krrish 3 grossed around  nett in third weekend to take its Hindi-version total to almost  nett in 17 days.
Krrish 3 grossed  nett with its Hindi version after the third week. According to Box Office India, the three versions together earned  nett lifetime with the dubbed versions of the film contributing .

Critics claimed that the domestic collections were inflated by almost  600 million. Some reputed trade analysts stated that the collections published in trade websites like Bollywood Hungama and Koimoi, which were being shown as nett, were actually gross (including Entertainment tax).

Overseas
Krrish 3 did well overseas as it collected around $3.85 million in its first weekend. The film grossed $6.9 million overseas in ten days. It grossed US$7.8 million abroad after seventeen days. The film earned $8.5 million overseas, as of 26 November 2013.

See also
 Science fiction films in India
 List of Hindi films of 2013
 Krrish
 Koi... Mil Gaya

Notes

References

External links
 
 
 
 
 
 

Krrish
2013 films
2013 science fiction action films
Films scored by Rajesh Roshan
Film superheroes
Films directed by Rakesh Roshan
Films shot in Jordan
Films shot in Mumbai
Films shot in Switzerland
Films shot in Turkey
2010s Hindi-language films
Indian science fiction action films
Indian sequel films
2010s Indian superhero films
Films about shapeshifting
Films about telekinesis
Films with screenplays by Robin Bhatt
Indian superhero films
Films about mutants
Indian science fiction films